Inagi City General Gymnasium is an arena in Inagi, Tokyo, Japan. It is the home arena of the Tokyo Cinq Reves of the B.League, Japan's professional basketball league.

References

Basketball venues in Japan
Indoor arenas in Japan
Sports venues in Tokyo
Tokyo Cinq Rêves
Inagi, Tokyo
Sports venues completed in 1992
1992 establishments in Japan